Vlastimil Zwiefelhofer (born 20 November 1952) is a Czech long-distance runner. He competed in the marathon at the 1980 Summer Olympics.

References

External links
 

1952 births
Living people
Athletes (track and field) at the 1980 Summer Olympics
Czech male long-distance runners
Czech male marathon runners
Olympic athletes of Czechoslovakia
People from Klatovy
University of West Bohemia alumni
Sportspeople from the Plzeň Region